Paul Bennett  (born 16 December 1988) is a British rower and Olympic gold medallist.

Rowing career
Bennett won the Boat Race in 2013 sitting at five for Oxford.

He competed at the 2014 World Rowing Championships in Bosbaan, Amsterdam, where he won a gold medal as part of the eight with Nathaniel Reilly-O'Donnell, Matthew Tarrant, Will Satch, Matt Gotrel, Pete Reed, Tom Ransley, Constantine Louloudis and Phelan Hill. The following year he was part of the British team that topped the medal table at the 2015 World Rowing Championships at Lac d'Aiguebelette in France, where he won a gold medal as part of the eight with Matt Gotrel, Louloudis, Reed, Moe Sbihi, Alex Gregory, George Nash, Satch and Hill.

In 2016 he won a gold medal in the eight at the 2016 Summer Olympics.

Awards
He was appointed Member of the Order of the British Empire (MBE) in the 2017 New Year Honours for services to rowing.

Education
From the age of about twelve until he was eighteen Bennett was educated at Roundhay School. Later he went on to graduate with a first class MSci in mathematics from King's College London in 2012, and completed an  MSc in Computer Science at Kellogg College, Oxford in 2013.

References

External links
 
 

1988 births
Living people
Alumni of King's College London
Alumni of Kellogg College, Oxford
English male rowers
Rowers from Greater London
British male rowers
World Rowing Championships medalists for Great Britain
Rowers at the 2016 Summer Olympics
Olympic rowers of Great Britain
Olympic gold medallists for Great Britain
Medalists at the 2016 Summer Olympics
Olympic medalists in rowing
Members of the Order of the British Empire
European Rowing Championships medalists